The 2008–09 Coppa Italia was the 62nd season of the tournament. The competition started on 9 August 2008 and ended on 13 May 2009. The radically different format used in the 2007–08 Coppa was abandoned, with the new format more closely resembling earlier editions of the tournament.

The final was played between Lazio and Sampdoria. The match ended with Lazio winning 6–5 on penalties. The first 90 minutes ended in a 1–1 draw, and no goals were scored in extra time. It was Lazio's fifth Coppa Italia title, and first since the 2003–04 edition. With the win, Lazio earned a spot in the play-off round of the 2009–10 UEFA Europa League.

Format
In the previous year, the number of teams participating was reduced to only 42: the teams in Serie A and Serie B. For 2008–09, that number was expanded to 78 with the addition of 18 clubs from Lega Pro Prima Divisione (formerly Serie C1), nine clubs from Lega Pro Seconda Divisione (formerly Serie C2) and nine clubs from Serie D. Also, except for the semifinals, all rounds were one-leg fixtures. The one-game final played at the Stadio Olimpico in Rome, which was first adopted in 2007–08, remained.

 First phase: one-leg fixtures
 First round: 18 clubs from Lega Pro Prima Divisione, 9 clubs from Lega Pro Seconda Divisione and 9 clubs from Serie D were paired
 Second round: All 22 clubs from Serie B were added to the 18 winners of the first round
 Third round: Clubs 9–20 from Serie A were added to the 20 winners of the second round
 Fourth round: 16 winners of the third round were paired
 Second phase: one-leg fixtures (except semifinals)
 Round of 16: Teams 1–8 from Serie A were paired with the 8 winners of the fourth round
 Quarterfinals
 Semifinals: two-leg fixtures
 Final: one-leg fixture at the Stadio Olimpico in Rome

Throughout the tournament, home stadium advantage was given to the projected higher seed (i.e., assuming no upsets). In the two-leg semifinals, the projected higher seed played the second leg at home.

Participating teams

Due to financial problems and other sanctions, the list of 78 teams was filled as follows:
 Serie A – all 20 teams
 Serie B – only 20 teams entered
 Messina, which finished 14th in 2007–08, and La Spezia, which finished 21st, were left off due to financial difficulties
 Lega Pro Prima Divisione – number of teams participating increased from 18 to 20
 top 10 teams from Girone C1/A and Girone C1/B based on 2007–08 standings were selected to enter
 Lucchese, which finished 8th in Girone C1/B were omitted
 Pro Sesto, which finished 11th in Girone C1/A with 43 points were selected. The 11th-placed team in C1/B had 40 points
 Lega Pro Seconda Divisione – 9 teams selected
 all three division champions from Girone C2/A, C2/B and C2/C
 both playoff finalists from each of the three divisions, a total of six teams
 Serie D – 9 teams selected
 all second-placed teams from each of the nine divisions, except for Girone D and Girone E where the third-placed teams were selected
 both Montichiari which finished second in Girone D, and Colligiana which finished second in Girone E, were promoted to Lega Pro Seconda Divisione

Bracket

Elimination rounds

Section 1

Match details

First round

Second round

Third round

Fourth round

Section 2

Match details

First round

Second round

Third round

Fourth round

Section 3

Match details

First round

Second round

Third round

Fourth round

Section 4

Match details

First round

Second round

Third round

Fourth round

Section 5

Match details

First round

Second round

Third round

Fourth round

Section 6

Match details

First round

Second round

Third round

Fourth round

Section 7

Match details

First round

Second round

Third round

Fourth round

Section 8

1 The match was played and Cremonese won by a score of 1–0, but were later disqualified for using a player who should have been under suspension. Reggiana was awarded a 3–0 victory as a result.

Match details

First round

Second round

Third round

Fourth round

Final stage

Bracket

Round of 16

Quarter-finals

Semi-finals

First leg

Second leg

Final

Top goalscorers

External links

 lega-calcio.it 
 RSSSF

Coppa Italia seasons
Italy
Coppa Italia